Pain (stylized as PAIN) is an action video game developed by Idol Minds and published by Sony Computer Entertainment for PlayStation 3. It was released as a downloadable title available from the PlayStation Store and was released in North America on November 29, 2007 and in the PAL region on March 20, 2008 and became the most popular downloadable game on the PlayStation Store. In June 2009, SCEE announced that the game was to be released on Blu-ray Disc. It was launched in Europe on June 24, 2009, in Australia on June 25, 2009 and in the UK on June 26, 2009. The Blu-ray version includes the original game as well as several other levels and features released as downloadable content for the PSN version. It is available in a collection which is available to download from the PlayStation Store called the 3D Collection. On November 26, 2013, the game's online features were disabled.

Gameplay
In Pain the player attempts to damage the ragdoll character they play and the environment as much as possible by flinging them from a rubber-band slingshot, using the Havok physics engine. The characters have distinctive poses and phrases, can move by "ooching" and can grab things to throw or hang from. Replay videos can be watched, and can be edited and uploaded to YouTube or the PlayStation 3's hard disk drive.

Characters
Besides the regular characters available, Santa Claus, Katsuaki Kato (Famitsu editor-in-chief, called Kato-san), Elvira, Flavor Flav, George Takei, Andy Dick and David Hasselhoff were remade in the game. PlayStation characters Buzz, Daxter and the titular Fat Princess are also available.

Levels
The game download included only the original environment, Downtown, which was a sandbox level with 3 unlockable environments. Downtown offered the modes Fun With Explosives, Spank The Monkey, Mime Toss, and Bowling. On November 24, 2010, Idol Minds provided long-time fans with a free environment called Hurt Falls, sponsored by AXE deodorant. It included the mode Fun With Explosives.

Downloadable content
Amusement Park, with one unlockable environment, and modes Fun With Explosives, Clown Toss, Hot N Cold, and Trauma; released on September 11, 2008.
Touchmounds Movie Studio, with one unlockable environment, and modes Fun With Explosives, Cratetastic, and Bowling; released on November 13, 2008.
Sore Spots, broken down into two environments, Morningwood High School and Area 69, each with one unlockable environment, and modes Fun With Explosives, PAINalympics, and Mad Science! Released on May 14, 2009.
Stiffstonian Museum, with one unlockable environment, and modes Fun With Explosives, Spank the Monkey, and Bowling; released on August 13, 2009.
Alpine Ski Area, with the mode Fun With Explosives.

Two Pain pinball machines are available for download, which have elements of Amusement Park and Area 69.

Development

On October 26, 2010 a new patch was released for PlayStation Move capabilities.

Reception

PAIN

PAIN received above-average reviews according to the review aggregation website Metacritic. GameSpot praised the game for its "great use of Havok physics engine" and "smartly sophomoric sense of humor," but criticized it for having just one level. IGN said, "One level, two characters, no online multiplayer and no way to share crazy clips sucks. However, there are a ton of trophies to unlock."

The game was referenced in the PlayStation 5 launch title Astro's Playroom, a celebration of the PlayStation brand.

Amusement Park

PAIN: Amusement Park received above-average reviews according to Metacritic.

See also
List of downloadable PlayStation games

References

External links
Pain official website
Idol Minds official website
 
 

2007 video games
Action video games
Crossover video games
Deck Nine games
Inactive online games
Multiplayer and single-player video games
PlayStation 3 games
PlayStation 3-only games
PlayStation Move-compatible games
PlayStation Network games
Products and services discontinued in 2013
Sony Interactive Entertainment games
Video games developed in the United States
Video games scored by Peter McConnell
Video games using Havok
Video games with custom soundtrack support
Video games with stereoscopic 3D graphics